"Girlfriend" is a single released by Billie in 1998, from her debut album Honey to the B. It reached number one in the United Kingdom, making her the youngest and first female solo singer to reach the top spot with her first two singles. On the American track listing for Honey to the B, the radio mix replaces the original album version. The B-side "Love Groove" is also featured on Honey to the B.

Releases
A radio edit with additional production by Cutfather & Joe was released for the single which differs significantly from the album version. The Australian single has become one of Billie's rarest CD singles. The cover for the Australian single differs slightly, as on the UK cover it says "Includes Tin Tin Out Mix & Exclusive Track" while on the Australian cover it says "Includes Because We Want To". "Girlfriend / She Wants You" was the second single released from the Japanese edition, released almost a whole year after the previous single, "Because We Want To" was released.

Release and chart performance
"Girlfriend" was released in the United Kingdom on 5 October 1998 as two CD singles and a cassette single. The song debuted on the UK Singles Chart on 11 October 1998 at number one. It remained on the chart for 12 weeks and was certified silver. In Ireland, the track reached number 12 on the Irish Singles Chart. "Girlfriend" debuted on the Swedish Singles Chart at number 37 on 29 October 1998. The following week it peaked at number 22.

In Australia, "Girlfriend" debuted on the ARIA Singles Chart at number 49 on 6 December 1998. Five weeks later, it peaked at number 35. The track debuted in New Zealand on 29 November 1998 at number three. It reached number two, its highest position, three weeks later and remained on the New Zealand Singles Chart for 18 weeks.

Music video
The video (directed by Phil Griffin) starts in an empty warehouse where several teenage boys are skateboarding. Billie and her friends sit on a sofa, admiring them. They soon get up and sing the chorus of "Girlfriend". Another guy arrives in a truck and Billie plays a game of pool with him. The two continue spend time together until the video ends. Cutscenes of Billie and her girl friends dancing are seen during the chorus.

The video uses the single version (the radio mix) of the song rather than the original album version.

Track listings

UK CD1 and European maxi-single
 "Girlfriend" (radio mix) – 3:55
 "Love Groove" – 4:29
 "Girlfriend" (Tin Tin Out mix) – 7:26

UK CD2
 "Girlfriend" (radio mix) – 3:55
 "Girlfriend" (D-Influence Real Live mix) – 4:35
 "Girlfriend" (Sgt. Rock mix) – 6:17
 "Girlfriend" (video) – 3:51

UK cassette single
A1. "Girlfriend" (radio mix) – 3:55
A2. "Love Groove" – 4:29
B1. Interview – 10:18

Australian maxi-single
 "Girlfriend" (radio mix)
 "Love Groove"
 "Girlfriend" (Tin Tin Out mix)
 "Because We Want To" (radio mix)

Personnel
Personnel are adapted from the Honey to the B liner notes.
 Billie Piper – vocals
 Jim Marr – production, keyboards, programming
 Wendy Page – production, backing vocals
 Pete Craigie – recording, mixing
 Yak Bondy – additional programming

Charts and certifications

Weekly charts

Year-end charts

Certifications

References

1998 singles
1998 songs
Billie Piper songs
EMI Records singles
Innocent Records singles
Number-one singles in Scotland
UK Singles Chart number-one singles
Virgin Records singles